Zdeněk Mraček (6 January 1930 – 17 August 2022) was a Czech politician. A member of the Civic Democratic Alliance, he served as mayor of Plzeň from 1990 to 1994.

Mraček died on 17 August 2022, at the age of 92.

References

External links
Zdeněk Mraček (Memory of Nations website)

1930 births
2022 deaths
Czech politicians
Czech neurosurgeons
Charles University alumni
Politicians from Plzeň
Physicians from Plzeň